"It's Magic" is a 1947 song by Doris Day. 

It's Magic may also refer to:

It's Magic (Abbey Lincoln album), a 1958 album by Abbey Lincoln
It's Magic (Sonny Stitt album), a Sonny Stitt album recorded in 1969 but withheld until 2005
It's Magic!, a 2014 album by Garou
"It's Magic", a song by Don Patterson from the 1966 album Goin' Down Home
"It's Magic", a song by Peter, Paul & Mary from the 2003 album In These Times
"It's Magic", a song from the Kidsongs 1995 video: "Let's Put on a Show"
"It's Magic" (Girls Aloud song), a song by Girls Aloud from the 2005 album Chemistry
It's Magic (1948 film), a 1948 released in the U.S. as Romance on the High Seas

See also
Magic (disambiguation)
"If It's Magic"